The 2018 WD-40 Danish FIM Speedway Grand Prix was the third race of the 2018 Speedway Grand Prix season. It took place on June 30 at the CASA Arena in Horsens, Denmark.

Riders 
The Speedway Grand Prix Commission nominated Michael Jepsen Jensen as the wild card, and Mikkel Michelsen and Mikkel Bech Jensen both as Track Reserves.

Results 
The Grand Prix was won by Tai Woffinden, who beat Artem Laguta, Greg Hancock and defending world champion Jason Doyle in the final. As a result, Woffinden took the overall world championship standings. Former leader Fredrik Lindgren failed to make the semi-finals, leaving him ten points behind Woffinden in second place.

Heat details

Intermediate classification

References 

2018
Denmark
International sports competitions hosted by Denmark
Horsens Municipality
Speedway Grand Prix of Denmark